Phosphate permeases are membrane transport proteins that facilitate the diffusion of phosphate into and out of a cell or organelle. Some of these families include:
 TC# 2.A.1.4 - Organophosphate:Pi Antiporter (OPA) Family, (i.e., Pho-84 of Neurospora crassa; TC# 2.A.1.9.2)
 TC# 2.A.20 - Inorganic Phosphate Transporter (PiT) Family
 TC# 2.A.47.2 - Phosphate porters of the Divalent Anion:Na+ Symporter (DASS) Family, includes Pho87/90/91
 TC# 2.A.58 - Phosphate:Na+ Symporter (PNaS) Family
 TC# 2.A.94 - Phosphate Permease (Pho1) Family

See also 
 Major facilitator superfamily
 Ion transporter superfamily
 Phosphotransferase
 Inorganic phosphate
 permeases
 Transporter Classification Database

See also 
 TC# 3.A.10 - H+, Na+-translocating Pyrophosphatase (M+-PPase) Family
 TC# 4.E.1 - Vacuolar (Acidocalcisome) Polyphosphate Polymerase (V-PPP) Family

Further reading 
 EMBL-EBI, InterPro. "Phosphate permease (IPR004738) < InterPro < EMBL-EBI". www.ebi.ac.uk. Retrieved 2016-03-03.
 "pho-4 - Phosphate-repressible phosphate permease pho-4 - Neurospora crassa (strain ATCC 24698 / 74-OR23-1A / CBS 708.71 / DSM 1257 / FGSC 987) - pho-4 gene & protein". www.uniprot.org. Retrieved 2016-03-03.
 Versaw, W. K. (1995-02-03). "A phosphate-repressible, high-affinity phosphate permease is encoded by the pho-5+ gene of Neurospora crassa". Gene 153 (1): 135–139. ISSN 0378-1119. PMID 7883177.
 Ramaiah, Madhuvanthi; Jain, Ajay; Baldwin, James C.; Karthikeyan, Athikkattuvalasu S.; Raghothama, Kashchandra G. (2011-09-01). "Characterization of the phosphate starvation-induced glycerol-3-phosphate permease gene family in Arabidopsis". Plant Physiology157 (1): 279–291. doi:10.1104/pp.111.178541. ISSN 1532-2548. PMC 3165876. PMID 21788361.
 Stakheev, A. A.; Khairulina, D. R.; Ryazantsev, D. Yu; Zavriev, S. K. (2013-03-22). "Phosphate permease gene as a marker for the species-specific identification of the toxigenic fungus Fusarium cerealis". Russian Journal of Bioorganic Chemistry 39 (2): 153–160.doi:10.1134/S1068162013020131. ISSN 1068-1620.

References 

Protein families
Solute carrier family